Claerhout is a Dutch surname used in Belgium. Notable people with the surname include:

 Arthur Claerhout (1887–1978), Belgian cyclist
 Frans Claerhout (1919–2006), Belgian painter
 May Claerhout (1939–2016), Belgian sculptor

Surnames of Belgian origin